Yuliya Krygina (born 10 February 1978) is a Kazakhstani alpine skier. She competed in the women's super-G at the 1998 Winter Olympics.

References

1978 births
Living people
Kazakhstani female alpine skiers
Olympic alpine skiers of Kazakhstan
Alpine skiers at the 1998 Winter Olympics
Place of birth missing (living people)
Asian Games medalists in alpine skiing
Asian Games bronze medalists for Kazakhstan
Alpine skiers at the 1996 Asian Winter Games
Alpine skiers at the 1999 Asian Winter Games
Medalists at the 1999 Asian Winter Games